Güneyməhlə (also, Güneyməhəllə) is a village in the municipality of Püstəqasım in the Quba Rayon of Azerbaijan.

References

Populated places in Quba District (Azerbaijan)